Branford High School is a public high school in Branford, Connecticut. As of 2021-22, it has 784 students in grades 9–12.

Its former principal, Edmund Higgins, retired at the end of the 2007–2008 school year.

All students must satisfy 13 performance graduation requirements  in areas such as writing, non-fiction reading, mathematical problem solving, and scientific concepts.

One notable aspect of the school was its "Senior Exhibition" program. Every student had to complete a thorough research project on a topic of his or her choice during senior year. This was presented in front of a panel of judges and is graded on a Pass/Fail system.

Branford High School is a member of the Southern Connecticut Conference, the second largest conference in the state. The school baseball team has won three state championships, in 1999, 2006, and 2009.

The student newspaper is The Branford Buzz, which is an online-only publication.

Notable alumni 

 Mike Olt, professional baseball player for the Chicago White Sox.  Formerly with the Red Sox, Texas Rangers and the Chicago Cubs.
Karen Owen, author of a faux thesis that caused a controversy when the document was publicized.
 Jen Toomey Track athlete, American Indoor record holder 1000m, quit track for 10 years after her freshman year.

References

External links
 

Buildings and structures in Branford, Connecticut
Schools in New Haven County, Connecticut
Public high schools in Connecticut
Educational institutions established in 1928
1928 establishments in Connecticut